Chamba is a village of Mansehra District in Khyber-Pakhtunkhwa province of Pakistan. It is located at 34°44'35N 73°38'15E with an altitude of 2571 metres (8438 feet).

References

Populated places in Mansehra District